Mary Kate McGeehan is an American actress and screenwriter. 
Her acting career has spanned several decades and she has appeared in a number of TV productions throughout the 1980s, 90s and 2000s into the 2010s.  She is the daughter of American actor Pat McGeehan.

Career
She is best known to television viewers for her role as Linda Gioberti in the 1980s prime-time drama series Falcon Crest. She appeared in the series from 1982 to 1984.

In the mid 80s she also appeared in the highly successful American sci-fi-action-adventure TV series Knight Rider, starring as "Jennifer Knight" in the episode titled "Knight of the Juggernaut" from 1985.

Since the 2004 Pilot of the Disney Channel's,  The Suite Life of Zack and Cody (2005),  she works as the Dialogue Coach for Dylan Sprouse and Cole Sprouse. She is also on the staff at Gary Spatz's  The Playground - A Young Actors Conservatory  (2006).

She and her writing partner, Susan Shaughnessy, won 5th place in the American Screenwriter's Association International Screenplay Competition, for their black comedy script, "Bearded Ladies" (May 2005).

Selected TV credits
Falcon Crest
Fantasy Island
The A-Team
Knight Rider
Simon and Simon
Magnum P.I.
Remington Steele
Hotel
Airwolf
Murder, She Wrote
Voyagers!
Beverly Hills, 90210
The Suite Life on Deck
Smart Guy
The Suite Life of Zack & Cody
Mike & Molly

References

External links

Year of birth missing (living people)
Living people
American television actresses